Actinonaias is a genus of freshwater mussels, aquatic bivalve mollusks in the family Unionidae, the river mussels.

Species
Species within the genus Actinonais include:
 Mucket Actinonaias ligamentina
 Actinonaias pectorosa

Unionidae
Bivalve genera
Taxonomy articles created by Polbot